Tin Can is a 2020 Canadian science fiction horror film, directed by Seth A. Smith. The film stars Anna Hopkins as Fret, a parasitologist who is working on the cure to a fungal pandemic when she is abducted and imprisoned in a life suspension chamber by mysterious forces.

The cast also includes Simon Mutabazi, Amy Trefry, Michael Ironside, Shelley Thompson and Taylor Olson.

Smith has clarified that the film was shot prior to the COVID-19 pandemic.

The film premiered at the Sitges Film Festival in 2020, and had its North American premiere at the Fantasia Film Festival in August 2021. It was also screened at the 2021 FIN Atlantic Film Festival, where it won the awards for Best Score and Best Cinematography in an Atlantic Canadian film. It has been acquired for commercial distribution by levelFilm, with commercial release planned for 2022.

References

External links
 

2020 films
2020 science fiction films
2020 horror films
Canadian body horror films
Canadian science fiction horror films
English-language Canadian films
Films directed by Seth A. Smith
2020s English-language films
2020s Canadian films